The Victorian Transport Study, better known as the Lonie Report, was an extensive study of freight and passenger transport within the state of Victoria, Australia. The study was set up on 13 June 1979 by the Government of Victoria, and the report was published on 26 September 1980.

Murray Lonie, a retired executive of General Motors and BHP, was appointed to head the study and the secretary was the head of the Country Roads Board, Robin Underwood.

Scope and aims
In the words of the authors the Lonie Report aimed to:
institute a study into all freight and passenger transport within Victoria, and to and from Victoria, in order to produce a co-ordinated transport system capable of meeting the needs of all residents of Victoria, having particular regard to the effect of transport on the balanced development of the State.

To some extent, the Lonie Report followed on from the Bland Report, a 1972 inquiry into land transport in Victoria by Sir Henry Bland, but was extended to cover a much greater number of topics, including, but not limited to, ports and air transportation. There were special sections for the transport of certain important commodities, including cement and grain.

Study and recommendations
Between June and December 1979, 41 individuals, 21 government agencies and 28 of the (then) 211 Victorian local government areas wrote submissions to the study, as did a large number of lobby groups representing various positions on the question of transport planning.

The writing of the report was done between December 1979 until its final publication in September 1980. It was presented to Transport Minister Rob Maclellan, and was released as a total of twenty-five volumes and a final report, containing recommendations on every topic covered.

The Lonie Report argued that, despite the immense change in demand for various modes of transportation since the beginning of the twentieth century, the transport system was still run by the same methods as prevailed in the nineteenth century. It argued for large-scale deregulation of transport markets, especially by the removal of the current restrictions on the carriage by road of such goods as cement, sawn timber, fertilisers and grain.

The report was particularly concerned about the operating losses made by VicRail due to significant declines in patronage and large increases in car ownership. The report fundamentally argued that it would be much too expensive to upgrade the rail system to be competitive with the car, or even with buses, and that therefore:

 all country passenger rail services, except from Melbourne to Geelong, should be replaced by buses
 trains on the suburban Port Melbourne, St Kilda, Altona, Williamstown, Alamein, Upfield and Sandringham lines should be replaced by buses, as should the Hurstbridge line beyond Eltham.
 trams from the city to South Melbourne Beach, South Melbourne and St Kilda Beach, Camberwell and West Maribyrnong, Kew/Cotham Road to St Kilda Beach, North Richmond to Prahran (and by default North Richmond to St Kilda Beach) and Footscray to Moonee Ponds should be replaced by buses
 all night-time and weekend rail services be replaced by buses or multi-hire taxis
 fares should be increased more frequently to eliminate public subsidies as soon as possible
 already-closed rural freight lines should remain closed and be dismantled to recycle the sleepers and steel
 small-volume freight should be shifted from rail to road
 a multi-modal public transport fare system be developed
 a system of multi-hire taxis be instituted to provide public transport in new suburbs

The report stated that because of increasing demand, Victoria's major highways should be duplicated. It also argued for the reservation of land to allow the construction of road bypasses around major towns on these highways. Within Melbourne, it argued for extensions to the Eastern and South Eastern Freeways, for the linking of the West Gate Freeway to Port Melbourne, and for the building of a ring road around the city, claiming that those increases in road capacity were needed to meet predicted demand for road transport. It also advocated a road bypass of Lilydale on the Maroondah Highway, and argued for the introduction of clearways on main suburban streets to speed up road traffic.

Another recommendation of the report was the staggering of school and work hours in order to spread out the demand on public transport services, which it said would reduce the overcrowding on those services during peak periods, and the number of under-used services at other times. The report argued that be done through employers being encouraged by government to develop more flexible hours.

Influence
The release of the Lonie Report by the government of Rupert Hamer led immediately to severe criticism, particularly from large numbers of people who used the rail services that the report recommended eliminating. As a result of public protests in the last three months of 1980, the Hamer Government was forced to reject a number of the report's recommendations. All tram services were retained, and the $115 million New Deal for Country Passengers, a plan for the reorganisation and revitalisation of country passenger rail services, was unveiled in February 1981.

Only the following country passenger rail lines were closed:

 Lilydale - Healesville: 1 March 1981
 Donald to Ballarat: March 1981
 Toolamba to Echuca: 2 March 1981
 Numurkah - Cobram: 27 April 1981
 Baxter - Mornington: 20 May 1981
 Frankston - Stony Point: June 1981
 Dandenong - Leongatha - Yarram: 6 June 1981
 Portland to Ararat: 12 September 1981

Some of those lines remained open for freight. Cobram, Stony Point and Leongatha passenger services were reinstated by the incoming Labor government, and the Baxter to Mornington line became a heritage railway. The Cobram and Leongatha passenger services were closed again by the Kennett Government.

The Hamer Government's plans to close several suburban rail lines were halted because of continuing protests. However, the St. Kilda and Port Melbourne lines were converted to light rail. Late night services on the Upfield Line were eliminated (they were restored in 1997) and a multimodal fare system was introduced that - unpredicted by the Report - boosted patronage to such an extent that historians  believe it has been responsible for the survival of the system.

Despite those changes, the Lonie Report proved very influential in transport planning, especially after the election of Jeff Kennett as premier. Indeed, the report could be seen as providing the basis for the "Linking Melbourne" project carried out during Kennett's seven years as Premier, and also for the elimination of the large number of regulatory mechanisms that governed transport in Victoria before the 1980s, which culminated in the privatisation of public transport in the 1990s. Some of the report's recommendations were carried out before Kennett became Premier, such as the linking of the South Eastern Freeway to the Mulgrave Freeway.

Criticism
The Lonie Report has been severely criticised ever since it was first released. Professional transport planners have generally believed that it only considered direct financial cost in making its recommendations. It has also been criticised for not fully considering how building additional road capacity affects people's decisions about whether to use private or public transport, creating induced demand for even more major road construction, thereby negating any benefit from building the road in the first place. The Public Transport Users Association argued that the report did not consider that further public transport service reductions would cause a vicious circle of greater declines in patronage, poorer cost recovery and even larger deficits.

The fact that the Lonie Report was written by people with a vested interest in increasing road transport has also led many professional planners at universities to question its assumptions and conclusions. The 1991 Russell Report, written by transport academic Bill Russell, claimed that the benefits of freeway building, which had been propagated by governments before and since the Lonie Report, were overstated.

Indeed, the Lonie Report could be seen as evidence for the relatively recent claims by academic Guy Pearse that car, mineral and fossil fuel lobby groups have long written government policy on energy and transport in Australia (see Greenhouse Mafia).

Perhaps more potent than criticisms based upon supposed involvement of vested interests, the Lonie Report had, as an underlying assumption, falling levels of public transport patronage; it failed completely to foresee Melbourne's rapid population growth, due to immigration, and increasing population density.

The Lonie Report noted the rapidly increasing levels of government subsidy to public transport. According to the report, at the time, cost recovery through fares was 53% for the Melbourne & Metropolitan Tramways Board and 49% for VicRail, both of which would be considered high rates of cost recovery now. Increasing subsidy levels are a trend that has continued in more recent years, albeit one apparently acceptable to government as a means to encourage people to shift to public transport. The Lonie Report seems to have been predicated upon a view that high levels of subsidy would be unacceptable to government and voters alike, which has not proven to be the case.

See also
 Ashworth Improvement Plan
 Operation Phoenix
 1969 Melbourne Transportation Plan
 New Deal
 Regional Fast Rail project
 Victorian Transport Plan
 List of Victoria Government Infrastructure Plans, Proposals and Studies

References

Further reading
 Australian Federated Union of Locomotive Engineers; The Lonie Report in Brief; published 1980 by the Victorian Division.

1980 in Australia
History of Victoria (Australia)
Transport in Victoria (Australia)
Public inquiries in Australia